Vale Tudo (Anything Goes in English) is a Brazilian telenovela produced and broadcast by TV Globo from May 16, 1988, to January 6, 1989.

Plot 
Raquel Accioli has been separated from her husband, Rubinho, for about ten years, a time when, after a violent argument, she decided to abandon him and go to live with her daughter, the ambitious Maria de Fátima, at her father's house, Salvador, in Foz do Iguaçu, Paraná. The family's only asset is a modest house that Salvador passed on to his granddaughter's name, so that when he died, she lacked nothing. Raquel lives as a tour guide and, when Salvador dies, Fátima, without saying anything to her mother, sells the house and leaves for Rio de Janeiro in search of earning a living, no matter how. In Rio she gets involved with César Ribeiro, a former model who had the catwalk world at his feet, and who acts as a call boy. Raquel leaves for Rio looking for her daughter. Maria de Fátima is introduced by César to Solange Duprat, fashion producer of Tomorrow magazine, starting to act as a model and live in his house, using her to get close to Afonso Roitman, the journalist's boyfriend, and to marry him.

The plot then shows duality: Maria de Fátima looking to get rich from her arranged marriage, while Raquel, selling sandwiches on the beach, ends up going up in life and, honestly, becomes owner of a chain of industrial restaurants. Raquel starts dating Ivan Meireles, but he ends up marrying Heleninha Roitman, which opposes Raquel to Odete Roitman, since she wants to keep Raquel from Ivan anyway. As the couple ends up getting closer, Odete gives her last card: she sends Ivan to bribe a Brazilian customs agent to release retained equipment, only that the businesswoman films the scene and starts to blackmail Raquel and Ivan, who ends up being arrested for corruption.

Cast

Awards 

Troféu APCA (1988)
 Best Telenovela - Vale Tudo
 Best Actress - Glória Pires
 Best Supporting Actor - Sérgio Mamberti
 Male Revelation - Paulo Reis

Troféu Imprensa (1988)
 Best Telenovela - Vale Tudo
 Best Actress - Beatriz Segall and Glória Pires

References

External links 
 Vale Tudo at Memoria Globo 
 

1988 telenovelas
Brazilian telenovelas
TV Globo telenovelas
1988 Brazilian television series debuts
1989 Brazilian television series endings
Brazilian LGBT-related television shows
Lesbian-related television shows
Telenovelas by Gilberto Braga
Portuguese-language telenovelas
Alcohol abuse in television